Sunfish Lake is a city in Minnesota, United States.

Sunfish Lake may also refer to:
 
Sunfish Lake (Minnesota), a lake in Minnesota, United States
Sunfish Lake (Ontario), a lake in Ontario, Canada

See also
Sunfish Pond, a lake in Worthington State Forest, New Jersey, U.S.